In some occult and similar writings, an archdemon (also spelled archdaemon), archdevil, or archfiend is a spiritual entity prominent in the infernal hierarchy as a leader of demons. Essentially, the archdemons are the evil opponents of the archangels.

Christian traditions
Archdemons are described as the leaders of demonic hosts, just as archangels lead choirs of angels. Based upon the writings of Saint Paul (Col. 1:16; Eph. 1:21) the angelic court had been constructed by Pseudo-Dionysius the Areopagite and comprised nine orders of angels with three orders each to three hierarchies.

The first hierarchy consists of seraphim, cherubim and thrones. The second hierarchy consists of dominations, virtues and powers.  The third hierarchy consists of principalities, archangels and angels.  This system of classifying angels has been accepted by the majority of Christian scholars.  However, no similar consensus has been reached on the 
classification of demons.  This is largely due to the fact that, historically, the definition of what an archdemon is and the names of those demons has varied greatly over time.

One common medieval classification associate the seven deadly sins with archdemons:
 Lucifer: Pride
 Mammon: Greed
 Asmodeus: Lust
 Leviathan: Envy
 Beelzebub: Gluttony
 Satan: Wrath
 Belphegor: Sloth

In the occult tradition, there is controversy regarding which demons should be classed as archdemons. During different ages, some demons were historically "promoted" to archdemons, others were completely forgotten, and new ones were created. In ancient Jewish lore, many of the pagan gods of neighboring cultures were identified as extremely pernicious demons in order to prevent Jews from worshiping them.

Therefore, the pagan deity Ba'al was reinterpreted as the archdemon Bael or Beelzebub, and the pagan deity Astarte was reinterpreted as the archdemon Astaroth.  These two in particular were seen as some of the worst enemies of God.  By the Middle Ages, these pagan deities were no longer worshiped, so their characterizations as archdemons were no longer important, but they still persisted anyway. New archdemons were invented over time, most of them revolving around Satan and the Antichrist.

Arabic and Middle Eastern occultism 
 

According to Middle Eastern Folkmagic usually, seven kings of the jinn are assigned to each day of the week. Although they can do, unlike the spirits of heavens, both good and evil, they have responsibility given by God regarding the affairs of the earth. In some reports, they are rather infernal demons (ʻIfrīt) than explicitly jinn. A hadith from Wahb ibn Munabbih reports that the archetypes of the jinn are like air, differing from the regular jinn, they don't need to eat, drink and they do not produce offspring. Since they do not move themselves, they send subordinate devils (shayāṭīn). They are mentioned in several Muslim treatises, such as the Book of Wonders. 

The Muslim occultist Ahmad al-Buni sets four of these kings named Mudhib, Maimun, Barqan and al-Ahmar, in opposition to the four archangels of Islam. They frequently appear inscribed in talismans. According to Muslim astrology, one needs to get permission of the king of the jinn for the corresponding day to perform a spell. When the jinn-king is summoned together with the name of the angel responsible for the day, it would be impossible for the jinn-king to deny an order of the sorcerer.

According to Mas'udi's "Annals of Time", four Afarit carry the throne of Iblis, analogue to the Hamlat al Arsh carrying the throne of God.

Middle Eastern tales 
In some Middle Eastern legends, an order of nineteen angels of hell exists, each commanding a host of devils. Among them is the Quranic guardian of hell-fire Maalik. Another Quranic member is the fallen angel Iblis, who is also their leader. However, most individual members are not based on the Quran, but integrated to Muslim understanding of sin. One member of the infernal council is responsible for distracting during prayer, one advocates illicit innovations in religious affairs, yet another one incites lust (etc.). These devils are not thought to fulfill the requests of a sorcerer, but serve as means of punishment in the hereafter or as adversaries of the prophet Solomon. According to the corresponding legend, both Solomon and the arch-devils struggle for their reign over the jinn and div.

Zoroastrianism
According to Zoroastrian dualism, the world is created by two opposing forces. The good deity Ahura Mazda created  everything good, but for everything good created Ahriman created an evil opposite. These results in the existence of seven Archdemons, who in return command a countless numbers of demons. These archdemons stay in exact opposition to the Amesha Spenta.

Demon Kings of the Ars Goetia
The Lesser Key of Solomon, an anonymous 17th century grimoire, lists 72 of the most powerful and prominent demons of Hell in its first part, the Ars Goetia. Satan himself is not mentioned among them considering his overall dominion of Hell as the Prince of Darkness. Below him, The Ars Goetia suggests, are the four kings of the cardinal directions who have power over the seventy-two, next the kings, and onward with other demons with lower monarchic titles. The four kings of the cardinal directions are the primary point of contention between different editions and translations, and occultist writers. The common composition of the kings is:
 King of the East: Amaymon
 King of the West: Corson
 King of the North: Ziminiar
 King of the South: Gaap
 King Bael
 King Paimon
 King Beleth
 King Purson
 King Asmodey
 King Viné 
 King Balam
 King Zagan
 King Belial

References

Demons
Ifrits